The Detmold Open-air Museum (English: "LWL Open-air Museum Detmold – Westphalian State Museum for Folkloristics") is a museum at Detmold in the Ostwestfalen-Lippe region of North Rhine-Westphalia, Germany. It was founded, together with the Hagen Open-air Museum, in 1960, and was first opened to the public in the early 1970s.

Exhibitions
Over 100 historic, rural buildings were transported and reconstructed from across the state, including schools, farmhouses, thatched cottages, and windmills. Over  of bucolic fields and ponds are available for horse-drawn carriage rides, walking tours, and picnicking. The museum also hosts special exhibitions and interactive craft demonstrations, such as blacksmithing and pottery-making. It is open seasonally, between 1 April and 31 October.

External links

 

Museums in North Rhine-Westphalia
Open-air museums in Germany
Open Air Museum